Az-Zahari is a sub-district located in the Al-Makha District, Taiz Governorate, Yemen. Az-Zahari had a population of 14,746 according to the 2004 census.

References  

Sub-districts in Al-Makha District